Thayer-Thompson House is a historic home located in Erie, Erie County, Pennsylvania. It was completed in 1861, and is a two-story five-bay brick irregularly-shaped dwelling. It is a combined Tuscan Villa / Italianate style building. It features round-headed windows, prominent brackets, hipped roof with overhanging eaves, and square roof belvedere. It has an enclosed porch with Corinthian order pilasters.

It was added to the National Register of Historic Places in 1985.

References

Houses on the National Register of Historic Places in Pennsylvania
Italianate architecture in Pennsylvania
Houses completed in 1861
Houses in Erie, Pennsylvania
1861 establishments in Pennsylvania
National Register of Historic Places in Erie County, Pennsylvania